Jung Hye-lim (Korean: 정혜림; born 1 July 1987) is a South Korean hurdler. At the 2012 Summer Olympics, she competed in the Women's 100 metres hurdles. In her home country, she was nicknamed "the eoljjang hurdler" for her pretty appearance.

Competition record

References

1987 births
Living people
South Korean female hurdlers
Olympic athletes of South Korea
Athletes (track and field) at the 2012 Summer Olympics
Athletes (track and field) at the 2010 Asian Games
Athletes (track and field) at the 2014 Asian Games
Athletes (track and field) at the 2018 Asian Games
Medalists at the 2018 Asian Games
Asian Games medalists in athletics (track and field)
Asian Games gold medalists for South Korea
World Athletics Championships athletes for South Korea
Sportspeople from Busan
Asian Games gold medalists in athletics (track and field)
21st-century South Korean women